Joseph Garside Pearson (26 March 1860 – 18 January 1892) was an English cricketer. Pearson's batting and bowling styles are unknown. He was born at Worksop, Nottinghamshire.

Pearson made a single first-class appearance for Nottinghamshire against Surrey at The Oval in 1883. Surrey won the toss and elected to bat, making 236 all out in their first-innings. Pearson bowled 3.1 overs toward the end of the innings, taking the wickets of William Roller, Frederick Johnson, and Ted Barratt, conceding just one run off his bowling. Nottinghamshire responded to Surrey's total by posting 405 all out in their first-innings, with Pearson being dismissed for a single run by Barratt. Surrey reached 112/3 in their second-innings, at which point the match was declared a draw. This was his only major appearance for Nottinghamshire.

He died at Boughton, Nottinghamshire, on 18 January 1892.

References

External links
Joseph Pearson at ESPNcricinfo
Joseph Pearson at CricketArchive

1860 births
1892 deaths
Sportspeople from Worksop
Cricketers from Nottinghamshire
English cricketers
Nottinghamshire cricketers